Dùn da Ghaoithe (meaning "fort of the two winds") is the second highest mountain on the Isle of Mull, western Scotland, and the island's only Corbett. It boasts sea views "in almost every direction", and is the main mountain seen by visitors to the island on leaving the Caledonian MacBrayne ferry from Oban at Craignure.

References

Mountains and hills of Argyll and Bute
Mountains and hills of the Scottish islands
Landforms of the Isle of Mull
Marilyns of Scotland
Corbetts